David Jay is an American activist for the awareness of asexuality.

David Jay is also the name of:

David J (born 1957), musician
David Jaye (born 1958), American politician

See also

Jay David (disambiguation)